"Wrecking Ball" is a song written and performed by American rock singer/songwriter Bruce Springsteen. It is the title track of his eponymous 17th studio album, but it was first released as a live single in 2009, and it charted at number three on the Hot Singles Sales chart.

History
The song had been written some years before the album for the concerts with the E Street Band at the Giants Stadium in Rutherford, New Jersey in 2009, before the stadium was demolished. A live version of the song from these concerts was released in 2009 as a single.

The song was included on the compilation Collection: 1973-2012 as well as on the collection of autobiographical songs Chapter and Verse.

"Wrecking Ball" was listed at number 43 in Rolling Stone list of Bruce Springsteen's 100 best songs. His guitarist Steve Van Zandt said about the song: "I think it's a great example of how good craft becomes art. I really believe that is how most of it happens. It's rare that someone sets out to do something that is great art and actually succeeds at it. Most of the time that's not the thought. Bruce certainly does that more than most."

References

Bruce Springsteen songs
2012 songs
Songs written by Bruce Springsteen